Mūrtipūjaka (lit. "image-worshipper"), also known as Derāvāsī ("temple-dweller") or Mandir Mārgī ("follower of the temple path"), is the largest sect of Śvetāmbara Jainism.  Mūrtipūjaka Jains differ from both Śvetāmbara Sthānakavāsī and Śvetāmbara Terāpanthī Jains in that they worship images of the Tīrthaṅkaras. Mūrtipūjaka may also generally describe members of both the Śvetāmbara and Digambara traditions who use idols (mūrti) in their worship (pūjā).

Agreements and disagreements 
According to Nalini Balbir, all Śvetāmbara sects agree upon "the authority of the Śvetāmbara canonical scriptures, with slight differences; claims of monastic descent from Sudharman, except for the Upakeśa-gaccha; [and] white monastic robes [for] monks and nuns." However, despite these commonalities, a central division exists between each of the sects as related to the use of images in worship.

Indeed, the early Jain reformer Loṅkā Śāh used the term "mūrtipūjaka" to classify an image-worshipping Jain from other kinds. Loṅkā is generally presented in his biographies as a scribe who lived in the Gujarat region during the 15th century. His occupation allowed him access to many Jain scriptures and manuscripts, which he interpreted to lack references to the construction of temples or the worship of images, despite both being prevalent at the time and also idols belonging to the time of Lord Mahavira being worshiped. He argued that these practices were spiritually dangerous by grounding them as violations of ahiṃsā, the principle of non-injury central to Jain religion and philosophy. According to Loṅkā, re-shaping the land to build temples leads to the destruction of small and microscopic organisms, and pūjā rituals entail "subtle forms of harm" through material offerings like flowers or incense.

Loṅkā's lasting influence brought to light an aniconic impulse within a strict, doctrinal understanding of Jain teaching. The Śvetāmbara Sthānakavāsī and Terāpanthī sects accept this impulse, agreeing with Loṅkā that the most appropriate form of religious practice is mental worship (bhāva-pūjā), which is already performed by mendicants, because the reliance on images and temples is indicative of an attachment to objects that is "spiritually counterproductive."
Mūrtipūjaka Jains respond to the criticisms of mūrti-pūjā in two ways: first, by revealing that it is, in fact, scripturally prevalent; and second, by saying that images are necessary for the spiritual practices of laypeople. The monk Ātmārām (1837 – 1896), who was originally a Śvetāmbara Sthānakavāsī monk and later became the mendicant leader Ācārya Vijayānandasūri, discovered upon reading early Jain texts in Prakrit and their Sanskrit commentaries that there was an abundance of references to image worship. This led him to believe that the non-Mūrtipūjaka position actually "contravened Jain scripture".

Muni Bhadraṅkaravijaya considered image worship as a means to cultivate morality by praising the qualities of the Tīrthaṅkaras and undergoing the ascetic practices associated with them. As such, given its disciplinary nature, "image worship will actually destroy a wide variety of karmas." Bhadraṅkaravijaya also argued that given the current cosmic age, it is not possible for laity to contemplate the Tīrthaṅkaras without the assistance of some sort of mental prop or image. Thus, a key element of the Mūrtipūjaka response to the controversy of image worship is to view the use of images as a tool to develop better spiritual practices, especially amongst the laity.

Other distinctions 
Outside the use of images in worship, Śvetāmbara Mūrtipūjaka Jains distinguish themselves in the use of the muhpattī. The muhpattī is a small, rectangular piece of cloth placed over the mouth, traditionally used to prevent harming small organisms either by inhaling them or expelling breath onto them. Mūrtipūjaka mendicants often wear this around their face by a string when they preach or read scriptures, or, according to Paul Dundas, they will simply hold it in place when necessary. In contrast, Śvetāmbara Sthānakavāsī and Terāpanthī mendicants permanently wear the muhpattī except while eating. Laypeople will hold a similar cloth in front of their mouths during certain rituals, where it is intended to "prevent pollution of the sacred objects by [the laity's] breath." However, Kristi Wiley notes that this is actually a different cloth from the muhpattī.

Gacchas
Derived from the word for "tree" - or as Wiley also suggests, a derivation of the terms "going" or "traveling together" - Śvetāmbara Mūrtipūjaka mendicants are divided into orders based on their pupillary lineages known as gacchas. Emerging between the 11th and 16th centuries, each of the gacchas claimed to represent a "truer" version of Jainism than another, and they often hotly contested one another in polemical debates and writings that argued against the laxity of mendicant regulations. Despite this, each of the gacchas shared a common ancestor, their respective records tracing back to the Tīrthaṅkara Mahāvīra’s disciple, Sudharman. During the medieval period in India, Mūrtipūjaka gacchas were numerous; however, in contemporary times, only a few major orders remain.

According to Peter Flügel, there are six existent orders:
 Kharatara Gaccha (1023 CE)
 A(ñ)cala Gaccha/Vidhi Pakṣa (1156 CE)
 Āgamika/Tristuti Gaccha (1193 CE)
 Tapā Gaccha (1228 CE)
 Vimala Gaccha (1495 CE)
 Pārśvacandra Gaccha (1515 CE)
However, Balbir identifies only four larger Mūrtipūjaka gacchas:
 Kharatara Gaccha (simply traced to 11th century CE)
 Pūrṇimā Gaccha (1093/1103 CE)
 Añcala Gaccha (dated at 1179 CE)
 Tapā Gaccha (1228 CE)
Balbir notably includes the Pūrṇimā Gaccha in her list, as well as regulates the Pārśvacandra, Vimala, and Tristuti Gaccha to the status of "minor" gacchas or "subsects." Despite this, both Flügel and Balbir recognize the significance of the Tapā Gaccha, which is the largest of the Śvetāmbara Mūrtipūjaka orders.

As previously mentioned, the Upakeśa Gaccha is also identified as a Śvetāmbara sect, which according to Dundas, eventually died out during the end of the medieval era. Unlike the orders listed above, they claim descent from the 23rd Tīrthaṅkara Pārśvanātha. According to Flügel, some Upakeśa Gaccha scholars like Devagupta Sūri considered "injury to living beings committed during the construction of temples and in the preparation of pūjā with flowers, fruits and water as a form of unavoidable or occupational violence (ārambhajā himsā)." In this sense, they are congruent with other Mūrtipūjaka sects and their beliefs in that some forms of violence are permissible, or at least outweighed, by the value of temples and pūjā rituals.

Notes

References
Balbir, Nalini (2014). "Śvetāmbara Mūrti-pūjaka". Jainpedia: the Jain Universe online.
Cort, John (2010). Framing the Jina: Narratives of Icons and Idols in Jain History. Oxford, UK: Oxford University Press. .
Dundas, Paul (2002). The Jains. London, UK: Routledge. .

Flügel, Peter (2008). "The Unknown Loṅkā: Tradition and the Cultural Unconscious". Jaina Studies. Motilal Banarsidas. pp. 181–279. .
Long, Jeffrey (2009). Jainism: An Introduction. London, UK: I.B. Tauris & Co. Ltd. .
Wiley, Kristi L. (2004). The A to Z of Jainism. Lanham, MD: The Scarecrow Press, Inc. .

Śvētāmbara sects